Ulrike Steinsky (born 21 September 1960) is an Austrian operatic soprano and voice teacher.

Life 
Born in Vienna, Steinsky completed her vocal studies with the Kammersängerin Hilde Zadek and Waldemar Kmentt. She followed this with training at the opera school of the Conservatory of the City of Vienna.

Since 1982, Steinsky has been an ensemble member of the Vienna State Opera and has also been engaged by the Vienna Volksoper since 1987. In 1995 she was appointed Kammersängerin.

Since 1992, she has also given concerts of classical Viennese music in Germany.

Since 2011, she has been working as a singing teacher in Vienna. On 3 December 2012, she was awarded the professional title of "Professor" by Federal President Heinz Fischer.

She is married to the tenor Alois Haselbacher. Her sister Eva, born in 1956, is also an opera singer (soprano). Furthermore, Steinsky is a practising Reiki therapy.

Recordings 
 Alban Berg: Lulu, with Julia Migenes, Margarethe Bence, Ulrike Steinsky, Theo Adam; conductor: Lorin Maazel, Orchester der Wiener Staatsoper, Ariola, Live recording 1983
 Mozart: Die Zauberflöte, with Barbara Hendricks, June Anderson, Ulrike Steinsky, Jerry Hadley, Gottfried Hornik (Papageno), Robert Lloyd, Thomas Allen, Scottish Chamber Orchestra, Scottish Chamber Chorus, conductor: Sir Charles Mackerras (Telarc 1991)

References

Further reading 
 Uwe Harten: Steinsky, Schwestern. In Oesterreichisches Musiklexikon. Online edition, Vienna 2002 ff., ; Print edition: vol. 5, Österreichischen Akademie der Wissenschaften presses, Vienna 2006, .
 Kutsch/Riemens: Großes Sängerlexikon. Unchanged edition., K. G. Saur Verlag, Bern, 1993, Third Volume Supplementary Volume,  (3 volumes)

External links 
 Ulrike Steinsky on Operabase
 Përformances with Ulrike Steinsky on Wiener Staatsoper
 
 Ulrike Steinsky on 
 
 

Austrian operatic sopranos
Voice teachers
Österreichischer Kammersänger
1960 births
Living people
Musicians from Vienna